Dizer Kola (also Romanized as Dīzer Kolā) is a village in Baladeh Kojur Rural District, in the Central District of Nowshahr County, Mazandaran Province, Iran. At the 2006 census, its population was 250, in 64 families.

References 

Populated places in Nowshahr County